Arnold Percy Donald Bliss (8 November 1909 – 1 December 1975) was an English footballer who played as a defender for Dartford, Port Vale, West Ham United,  Stalybridge Celtic, Rochdale, and Stafford Rangers.

Career
Bliss played for Dartford before joining Second Division side Port Vale in October 1929. He made his debut in a 2–1 defeat to Charlton Athletic at The Valley on 7 November 1931 and jockeyed with Jack Round for the number 5 jersey throughout the season; Round won this battle and kept Bliss to just six appearances. In the next season Bliss filled in for George Shenton on three occasions before being released from The Old Recreation Ground in April 1933. After a trial with West Ham United, he moved on to Stalybridge Celtic, Rochdale and Stafford Rangers.

Career statistics
Source:

References

People from Wolstanton
English footballers
Association football defenders
Dartford F.C. players
Port Vale F.C. players
West Ham United F.C. players
Stalybridge Celtic F.C. players
Rochdale A.F.C. players
Stafford Rangers F.C. players
English Football League players
1909 births
1975 deaths